The Pamvotis chub (Squalius pamvoticus) is a species of ray-finned fish in the family Cyprinidae. It is found in Kalamas, Acheron, Louros and Arachthos drainages in Albania and Greece.

References

Squalius
Fish described in 1939
Taxa named by Alexander I. Stephanidis